Terfezia (Berber: Tirfas) is a genus of truffle-like fungi within the Pezizaceae family. Terfezia species are commonly known as desert truffles. Some authorities consider this the type genus of the family Terfeziaceae, although phylogenetic analysis suggests that it nests within the Pezizaceae. The Dictionary of the Fungi (10th edition, 2008) suggests that the genus contains 12 species. A recent (2011) publication used molecular analysis to show that the American Terfezia species had been incorrectly classified, and moved Terfezia spinosa and  Terfezia longii to Mattirolomyces and Stouffera, respectively; as a result, no Terfezia species are known to exist in North America.

Israeli agricultural scientists have been attempting to domesticate T. boudieri into a commercial crop.

Species
, Index Fungorum accepts 34 species in Terfezia:

Terfezia albida
Terfezia alsheikhii
Terfezia aphroditis
Terfezia arenaria
Terfezia berberiodora
Terfezia boudieri
Terfezia cadevalli
Terfezia canariensis
Terfezia castanea
Terfezia claveryi
Terfezia decaryi
Terfezia deflersii
Terfezia eliocrocae
Terfezia eremita
Terfezia extremadurensis
Terfezia fanfani
Terfezia hafizi
Terfezia hanotauxii
Terfezia hispanica
Terfezia indica
Terfezia leptoderma
Terfezia lutescens
Terfezia magnusii
Terfezia mellerionis
Terfezia metaxasi
Terfezia olbiensis
Terfezia ovalispora
Terfezia pallida
Terfezia pini
Terfezia pseudoleptoderma
Terfezia rosea
Terfezia schweinfurthii
Terfezia sinuosa
Terfezia transcaucasica
Terfezia zeynebiae

References

Pezizaceae
Pezizales genera